Gallup Pakistan, affiliated to Gallup International Association, is a research organization located in Pakistan.

It was established in 1980 by experts trained at Massachusetts Institute of Technology (MIT), Stanford University and Wharton School of Business. It is now considered one of the country’s largest and oldest research institutions.

It is not related to The Gallup Organization. Each year Gallup Pakistan conducts several high profile studies for the Government of Pakistan and international agencies. It has worked for a number of UN agencies in Pakistan, and has occasionally provided research support for projects conducted by academic institutions, World Bank, WHO, UNICEF, ILO, UNIDO etc.

Field Network 
They have three service offices at Karachi, Lahore and Islamabad and a large network of Field Staff, operating from 17 field Offices located in all the four provinces of the country. It has local teams in 34 districts.

Currently, their field offices are located in many locations, from where they cover rural and urban areas in the surrounding districts.

Gallup Pakistan's poll for 2018 elections
According to November 2017 polls and survey by Gallup Pakistan, nationwide results show that a majority of the people in Punjab prefer Pakistan Muslim League (N), Khyber Pakhtunkhwa stands with Pakistan Tehreek-e-Insaf, while the province of Sindh prefers Pakistan Peoples Party. A large majority of Pakistani people wanted elections on time.

In 2013, Gallup Pakistan's poll about 2013 Pakistani general election turned out to be largely correct because it predicted, in April 2013, a comfortable lead for Nawaz Sharif's party, Pakistan Muslim League (N) ahead of the 11 May 2013 elections.

Gallup Pakistan Media Report 
Gallup Pakistan Media Reports & Media Surveys have been providing figures for over 30 years. It also provides the country’s Television Ratings, subscribed by all of the top ten advertising agencies, and it also carries out extensive research on newspaper and radio audiences. Gallup launched people meters in Pakistan. And according to Gallup Pakistan, Geo News is the most watched channel of Pakistan in 2018.

Cyberletters 
Weekly Cyberletters are a compilation of Gallup Pakistan’s daily Polls and monthly cyberletter provides media trends.

Gallup Pakistan's Gilani Poll 
Gallup Pakistan releases one press release every working day on a public interest issue based on Nationally Representative Surveys.

Gallup International 
Gallup Pakistan is the sole representative of Gallup International in Pakistan.

References

Companies established in 1980
Public opinion research companies
Political and economic think tanks based in Pakistan